He Found a Star is a 1941 British musical film directed by John Paddy Carstairs and starring Vic Oliver, Sarah Churchill and Evelyn Dall. It concerns a frustrated stage manager who quits his job and, with his secretary's help, sets up a theatrical agency. Its songs include Waitin''' (Manning Sherwin & Harold Purcell) and Salome (Sarah Churchill). Its sets were designed by Alfred Junge.

Plot
Theatrical agent Lucky Lyndon (Vic Oliver) and his loyal secretary Ruth Cavour (Sarah Churchill) use their talent agency to discover unknown talents. In his search for the next "big star," Lyndon tries to promote ungrateful nightclub singer Suzanne (Evelyn Dall). Meanwhile, Ruth, who is madly in love with Lyndon, saves the day when the increasingly difficult Suzanne causes a crisis.

Cast
 Vic Oliver as Lucky Lyndon
 Sarah Churchill as Ruth 'Ruthie' Cavour
 Evelyn Dall as Suzanne
 Gabrielle Brune as Diane
 J.H. Roberts as Mr. Victor Cavour
 Barbara Everest as Mrs. Cavour
 Joan Greenwood as Babe Cavour
 David Evans as Jimmy Cavour
 Robert Sansom as Dick Hargreaves
 Jonathan Field as Bob Oliphant
 Mignon O'Doherty as Mrs. Miley
 Peggy Novak as Madame
 Robert Atkins as Frank Forrester
 George Merritt as Max Nagel
 Raymond Lovell as Nick Maurier
 Uriel Porter as George Washington 'Wash' Brown  
 Peggy McCormack as Rose, Lucky's date  
 Charles Victor as Ben Marsh  
 Cyril Chamberlain as Louie 
 Jack Kellaway as Jack  
 Sylvia Kellaway as Elsie 
 Eileen Bennett as Sleepy 
 Peter Saunders as Raymond Alvarez

Critical receptionAllmovie'' noted, "An average subject at best."

References

External links

1941 films
1941 musical comedy films
Films directed by John Paddy Carstairs
British musical comedy films
Films set in London
British black-and-white films
1940s English-language films
1940s British films